Naane Raja may refer to:

Naane Raja (1956 film), a Tamil film directed by A. Bhim Singh and starring Sivaji Ganesan and M. N. Rajam
Naane Raja (1984 film), a Kannada film directed by C. V. Rajendran and starring V. Ravichandran and Ambika